Gulnar Hayytbaeva is a Turkmenistani judoka. At the 2012 Summer Olympics she competed in the Women's 63 kg, but was defeated in the first round by Ramila Yusubova.

She graduated from The National Institute of Sports and Tourism of Turkmenistan in 2013. At the 2013 Summer Universiade she won a bronze medal in belt wrestling (freestyle 66 kg).

References

Turkmenistan female judoka
Year of birth missing (living people)
Living people
Olympic judoka of Turkmenistan
Judoka at the 2012 Summer Olympics
Judoka at the 2006 Asian Games
Judoka at the 2010 Asian Games
Judoka at the 2014 Asian Games
Asian Games competitors for Turkmenistan
Medalists at the 2013 Summer Universiade
21st-century Turkmenistan women